Agriades is a genus of butterflies in the family Lycaenidae. Its species are found in temperate Asia, Europe, and North America.

Taxonomy
As a result of studies of molecular phylogenetics, Agriades has been enlarged to include some of the species that used to be placed in Albulina (see the orbitulus species-group below) and in Vacciniina (see the optilete species-group).

In some earlier classifications, these three genera used to be included in Plebejus.

Species
Listed alphabetically within groups:

The aquilo species-group:
 Agriades diodorus (Bremer, 1861) Mongolia, North China,  South Siberia
 Agriades glandon (de Prunner, 1798) – Glandon blue or Arctic blue (including Agriades aquilo, Agriades cassiope, and Agriades franklinii)
 Agriades podarce (C. & R. Felder, [1865])

The ellisi species-group:
 Agriades ellisi (Marshall, 1882) Himalaya
 Agriades errans (Riley, 1927) Himalaya
 Agriades jaloka Moore, [1875]) Himalaya, Baltistan, Kashmir
 Agriades janigena (Riley, 1923) Tibet
 Agriades kurtjohnsoni Bálint, 1997 Himalaya
 Agriades morsheadi (Evans, 1923) Tibet

The pyrenaica species-group:
 Agriades aegagrus (Christoph, 1873) North Iran
 Agriades dardanus (Freyer, 1845) – often included in Agriades pyrenaica
 Agriades forsteri Sakai, 1978 Central Asia
 Agriades pheretiades (Eversmann, 1843) 
 Agriades pyrenaica (Boisduval, 1840) – Gavarnie blue
 Agriades zullichi Hemming, 1933

The sikkima species-group:
 Agriades dis (Grum-Grshimailo, 1891) Central Asia, Himalaya
 Agriades luana (Evans, 1915) Tibet
 Agriades sikkima (Harcourt-Bath, 1900) Himalaya

Ungrouped:
 Agriades kumukuleensis (Huang & Murayama, 1988) Afghanistan
 Agriades walterfoster (Koçak, 1996) China

The orbitulus species-group:
 Agriades amphirroe (Oberthür, 1910) Tibet
 Agriades arcaseia (Fruhstorfer, 1916) Sikkim, Tibet
 Agriades armathea (Fruhstorfer, 1916) China
 Agriades artenita (Fruhstorfer, 1916) China
 Agriades asiatica (Elwes, 1882) Central Asia, Himalaya
 Agriades lehanus (Moore, 1878) Himalaya, Kashmir, Tibet
 Agriades orbitulus (de Prunner, 1798) – alpine argus
 Agriades orbona (Grum-Grshimailo, 1891) China
 Agriades pharis (Fawcett, 1903) Himalaya, Sikkim
 Agriades shahidulla (Yoshino, 2003) China

The optilete species-group:
 Agriades optilete (Knoch, 1781) – cranberry blue

References

External links

images representing Agriades at Consortium for the Barcode of Life

 
Lycaenidae genera
Taxa named by Jacob Hübner
Taxonomy articles created by Polbot